The North West Counties Football League is a football league in the North West of England. Since 2019–20, the league has covered the Isle of Man, Cheshire, Greater Manchester, Lancashire, Merseyside, Cumbria, northern Staffordshire, northern Shropshire, the far west of West Yorkshire, and the High Peak area of Derbyshire. In the past, the league has also hosted clubs from North Wales such as Caernarfon Town, Colwyn Bay and Rhyl. As from season 2018–19 the league increased from two, to three divisions: the Premier Division, at level nine (Step 5 in the NLS) in the English football league system, and two geographically separate Division Ones, North and South, at level ten (Step 6 in the NLS). The league is a member of the Joint Liaison Council which administers the Northern arm of the National Football System in England.

History
The league was formed in 1982 by the merger of the Cheshire County League and the Lancashire Combination. It originally consisted of three divisions, but this was reduced to two in 1987, partly because of the creation of an extra division in the Northern Premier League (NPL). At the same time, promotion and relegation between the two leagues was introduced, with either the first or second placed club in the North West Counties Football League (NWCFL) being entitled to a place in the NPL, subject to their ground meeting that league's requirements.

The NWCFL has six feeder leagues of its own with eligibility for promotion to the First Division being accorded to champions of the Cheshire Association Football League, Liverpool County Premier League, West Cheshire Amateur Football League, Staffordshire County Senior League, West Lancashire Football League, and Manchester Football League, subject to their grounds meeting the NWCFL's requirements.

The first sponsorship of the NWCFL came in with Bass who remained the league sponsors until 1995. In 1998, the regional train operating company, First North Western became the new sponsor in a two-year deal.  Hallmark Security were a commercial Partner to the League for three years between 2015 and 2018.

In the 2008–09 season, Division One was renamed the Premier Division and Division Two became the First Division. A new division at level ten was announced for the 2018–19 season, therefore the First Division was recreated as North and South divisions.

Four clubs have won a league and cup double, Ashton United in 1991–92, Kidsgrove Athletic in 1997–98, F.C. United of Manchester in 2006–07 and Glossop North End in 2014–15, while Atherton Laburnum Rovers are the only club to have won consecutive championships in 1992–93 and 1993–94. For three consecutive seasons in the 1980s Clitheroe won each of the NWCFL divisions. In 1983–84 they were Division Three champions, the following season they won the Division Two championship and then in 1985–86 they were crowned Division One champions.

The league is currently home to two former Football League clubs, Northwich Victoria, who were founder members of Division 2 of the English Football League in 1892 but they resigned two seasons later (they joined along with Newton Heath FC, who later went on to become Manchester United), and Nelson, while Darwen F.C. are a continuation of Darwen.

Going in the other direction, former NWCFL members Accrington Stanley have risen to play in the Football League as have Fleetwood Town and more recently Salford City, who were last in the league in 2008, were promoted into the EFL at the end of the 2018-19 Season via the promotion play-off at Wembley.

For sixteen years the record attendance for a NWCFL match was 1,353 for a First Division championship decider between Radcliffe Borough and Caernarfon Town in the 1982–83 season. In the 1998–99 season a crowd of 2,281 saw Workington's championship deciding match with Mossley at Borough Park. In the 2005–06 season a new record was set, with 6,023 at Gigg Lane for a Division Two match between FC United of Manchester and Great Harwood Town on 23 April 2006. The following season, due mainly to the relatively large support for FC United of Manchester, saw attendances rise and included a record 4,058 for an evening match, with Salford City's Division One home game against FC United of Manchester.

The league has two cup competitions – the League Challenge Cup, which is open to all clubs, and the First Division Challenge Cup. For sponsorship reasons the League Challenge Cup is known as The Macron Challenge Cup. Until it was disbanded in 2014, the league also ran a reserve league together with its own dedicated League Cup. From 1990–1991 to 1999–2000 the league also ran a Floodlit Trophy competition.

Member clubs (2022–23)

Premier Division

Division One North

Division One South

Previous divisional champions

1982–87
The league was formed with three divisions.

1987–2008
Due to the expansion of the Northern Premier League, and the withdrawal of clubs who could no longer meet the ground requirements, the third division was disbanded and a two division format was instigated, a format that stayed in place until 2018.

2008–18

In the 2008–09 season, the league renamed their divisions to the Premier Division and First Division.

2018–present
As from the 2018–19 the league has operated three divisions, the Premier Division at Step 5 and Division one - the Step 6 division being split geographically into North and South components both with promotional slots to Step 5.  This was retained for the 2019-20 season.

League Challenge Cup winners
The NWCFL League Challenge Cup is for all members of the league.

 1982–83 – Darwen
 1983–84 – Ellesmere Port & Neston
 1984–85 – Leek Town
 1985–86 – Warrington Town
 1986–87 – Colne Dynamoes
 1987–88 – Warrington Town
 1988–89 – Colwyn Bay
 1989–90 – Knowsley United
 1990–91 – Vauxhall GM
 1991–92 – Ashton United
 1992–93 – Burscough
 1993–94 – Rossendale United
 1994–95 – Nantwich Town
 1995–96 – Burscough
 1996–97 – Newcastle Town
 1997–98 – Kidsgrove Athletic
 1998–99 – Vauxhall GM
 1999–2000 – Skelmersdale United
 2000–01 – Formby
 2001–02 – Prescot Cables

 2002–03 – Mossley
 2003–04 – Bacup Borough
 2004–05 – Cammell Laird
 2005–06 – Salford City
 2006–07 – F.C. United of Manchester
 2007–08 – Maine Road
 2008–09 – New Mills
 2009–10 – Abbey Hey
 2010–11 – Winsford United
 2011–12 – Bacup Borough
 2012–13 – Runcorn Linnets
 2013–14 – Ashton Athletic
 2014–15 – Glossop North End
 2015–16 – Atherton Collieries
 2016–17 – City of Liverpool
 2017–18 – Widnes
 2018–19 – 1874 Northwich
 2019–20 – 1874 Northwich
 2020–21 – Not held
 2021–22 – Charnock Richard

First Division Challenge Cup winners
The First Division Challenge Cup is for all members of the First Division. It was known as the Second Division Trophy from 1989 to 2008.

 1989–90 – Great Harwood Town
 1990–91 – Glossop
 1991–92 – Newcastle Town
 1992–93 – Stantondale
 1993–94 – North Trafford
 1994–95 – Formby
 1995–96 – Ramsbottom United
 1996–97 – Nelson
 1997–98 – Tetley Walker
 1998–99 – Fleetwood Freeport
 1999–2000 – Warrington Town
 2000–01 – Squires Gate
 2001–02 – No competition
 2002–03 – Stone Dominoes
 2003–04 – Colne
 2004–05 – Cammell Laird
 2005–06 – Flixton

 2006–07 – New Mills
 2007–08 – Kirkham & Wesham
 2008–09 – AFC Liverpool
 2009–10 – AFC Liverpool
 2010–11 – Atherton Collieries
 2011–12 – Norton United
 2012–13 – West Didsbury & Chorlton
 2013–14 – Formby
 2014–15 – AFC Darwen
 2015–16 – Barnton
 2016–17 – City of Liverpool
 2017–18 – Prestwich Heys
 2018–19 – Sandbach United
 2019–20 – Sandbach United
 2020–21 – Not held
 2021–22 – FC Isle of Man

First Division Champions Cup winners
The First Division Champions Cup is for the winners of the two geographical divisions within Division One. Its inaugural season was 2018–19.

 2018–19 – Rylands
 2019–20 – No winner
 2020–21 – Not held
 2021–22 – Not held

Floodlit Trophy winners
The NWCFL Floodlit Trophy was for all members of the Premier and First divisions.

 1990–91 – Colwyn Bay
 1991–92 – Great Harwood Town
 1992–93 – Newcastle Town
 1993–94 – Bootle
 1994–95 – Penrith

 1995–96 – Newcastle Town
 1996–97 – Colwyn Bay
 1997–98 – Burscough
 1998–99 – Clitheroe
 1999–2000 – Vauxhall GM

Notes

References

External links

Current league tables
NWCL at Non League UK

 
1982 establishments in England
9
Sports leagues established in 1982